Studio Zoo is the fourth studio album by British singer-songwriter Newton Faulkner, and the first album he has produced himself. Its recording, which took place in June and July 2013 at Faulkner's home, was streamed live online. The album was released on 26 August 2013.

Recording 

The recording of Studio Zoo was being streamed live online, 24/7 for 5 weeks from 11 June 2013. His home studio in East London was set up with 4 cameras, to allow fans to follow every detail of recording the album – with no producer or engineer, only Faulkner and a few guests, such as The X Factor'''s Janet Devlin and Ted Dwane (of Mumford & Sons). Fans were also able to follow regular updates on the social networks, such as Facebook and Twitter. The campaign used the hashtag #StudioZoo which allowed users tweets to play sounds in Faulkner's house. The campaign concluded in a party at Faulkner's house with a set jungle. There was a toy jeep which would drive forward every time someone tweeted #StudioZoo. The #StudioZoo campaign was created and ran by Powster.

"I am as excited as I am terrified by the prospect of having a house full of cameras film me while trying to record an album. The entire recording process will be streamed live and nothing has been recorded in advance - apart from some particularly good hand claps recorded in Paris.  The album will be made before your very eyes, no tricks, no producer and no engineer, just me, a guitar and a few surprise guests," said Faulkner.

"With the whole album I gave myself relatively strict rules. The main criticism I’ve had in the past has been that my recordings have been overly layered and polished. So as this is the first album I’ve ever produced myself, I aimed to make sure this wasn’t the case. I limited myself to one guitar part per track, which meant I pushed my playing considerably further than ever before. I also tried to harmonise with myself as little as possible vocally," he said in an interview with The Independent. "So that the main guitar part and lead vocal had to carry every track the way it does when I play live. I did allow myself to get in great players and singers to add more light and shade. Andreya Trianna and Janet Devlin both did awesome harmonies and guitar-wise I was joined by some of best acoustic guitarists in the world, Thomas Leeb and Nick Harper. Ted Dwane from Mumford and Sons played some double bass and India Borne, who plays cello and bunch of stuff for Ben Howard, popped in too. I was very lucky."

Promotion
The lead single to promote the album, "Losing Ground", was released on 8 September 2013. Faulkner said that the song "is about battling on even when you know you're on the back foot. You go through ups and downs and it's about being in a down but being ok with it, because you know there must be an up on the way... hopefully." A music video for the song, created by London-based motion graphics company Powster, was released onto YouTube on 21 August 2013.

Reception

Critical reception
Caroline Sullivan of The Guardian gave the album three out of five stars, and commented that Faulkner, whose calling card is laidback amiability, should start playing against type and "rather than swaddling every song in layers of delicately picked guitar, he should have found his inner wildebeest and let it roar." She added that he seems to be apologising for his very existence, and "had he stopped burying the emotions under passive-aggressive sweetness and let his voice ratchet up a few notches, this could have been an interesting album."

Commercial performance
Commercially, Studio Zoo'' has been less successful than Falkner's previous albums. On the UK Albums Chart, it debuted at number 10, and peaked at number 51 on the Irish Albums Chart.

Track listing 
Writing credits from AllMusic.

Personnel

Musicians
 Newton Faulkner – lead vocals, guitar, bass guitar, piano, guitarrón, mandolin, banjo, guzheng
 Nick Harper – guitar, backing vocals 
 Thomas Leeb – guitar
 India Bourne – cello
 Ted Dwane – double bass, backing vocals
 Toby Faulkner – backing vocals
 Andreya Triana – backing vocals
 Janet Devlin – backing vocals
 Sam Brookes – backing vocals
 Dan Dare – backing vocals
 Random Impulse – backing vocals
 Ryan Keen – backing vocals
 Nikki Lamborn – backing vocals
 Anna Baines – backing vocals

Technical personnel
 Newton Faulkner – production, engineering
 Andy Parker – mixing (tracks 1, 4, 7, 9, 11–13)
 Ben Phillips – mixing (tracks 2, 3, 5, 6, 8 and 10)
 John Davis – mastering
 Emily Coxhead  – photography, design

Charts

References

2013 albums
Newton Faulkner albums